Jean-Marie Wampers (born 7 April 1959) is a former professional road racing cyclist from Belgium. He was a professional between 1981 and 1992, achieving his greatest triumph when he won Paris–Roubaix in 1989.

Major results

1978
 3rd Overall Tour de Namur
1st Stage 1
1980
 3rd Overall Triptyque Ardennais
1st Stage 3b
1981
 3rd Giro del Lazio
 4th Giro dell'Emilia
 5th Milano–Torino
 7th Coppa Bernocchi
 9th Milano–Vignola
1982
 1st Gran Premio Città di Camaiore
 10th Giro dell'Appennino
1983
 2nd Circuit des Frontières
 3rd Polder-Kempen
 5th Kampioenschap van Vlaanderen
 5th GP Eddy Merckx
 6th Paris–Tours
 8th Paris–Brussels
 8th Trofeo Laigueglia
1984
 1st Druivenkoers Overijse
 2nd Scheldeprijs
 4th Brussel–Ingooigem
 5th GP Victor Standaert
 6th GP Eddy Merckx
 7th Brabantse Pijl
 8th Binche–Tournai–Binche
 10th Overall Tour of Belgium
1985
 1st Nationale Sluitingsprijs
 2nd Brabantse Pijl
 9th Tour of Flanders
1986
 1st Rund um den Henninger-Turm
 1st Omloop van het Leiedal
 3rd Gent–Wevelgem
 3rd GP de Fourmies
 4th Brabantse Pijl
 6th Overall Four Days of Dunkirk
1st Stage 4
 9th Paris–Brussels
1987
 3rd Brabantse Pijl
 4th Dwars door België
 9th Overall Four Days of Dunkirk
 10th Overall Three Days of De Panne
1988
 5th Tour du Nord-Ouest
1989
 1st Paris–Roubaix
 1st Scheldeprijs
 1st Rund um den Henninger-Turm
 2nd Le Samyn
 7th E3 Prijs Vlaanderen
1990
 5th Paris–Roubaix
 5th Gent–Wevelgem
 8th E3 Prijs Vlaanderen
1992
 1st Binche–Tournai–Binche
 2nd Omloop van de Westhoek

External links

Living people
Belgian male cyclists
1959 births
People from Uccle
Cyclists from Brussels